Natifah is a village in Jordan approximately 2 km south-west of Irbid.

History
In 1596 it appeared in the Ottoman tax registers named as Natifa, situated in the nahiya (subdistrict) of Bani al-Asar, part of the Sanjak of Hawran. It had 17 households and 9 bachelors; all Muslim. The villagers paid a fixed tax-rate of 25% on agricultural products; including wheat, barley, summer crops, vineyards/fruit trees, goats and bee-hives. The total tax was 5,500 akçe.

In 1838  Natifah's inhabitants were predominantly Sunni Muslims.

The Jordanian census of 1961 found 451 inhabitants in Natifa.

References

Bibliography

 

Villages in Irbid governorate